Silver cyanate is the cyanate salt of silver. It can be made by the reaction of potassium cyanate  with silver nitrate in aqueous solution, from which it precipitates as a solid.
 {AgNO3} + {KNCO} \rarr {Ag(NCO)} + {K+} + {NO3^-} 
Alternatively, the reaction  
{AgNO3} + {H2N-C(O)-NH2} \rarr {AgNCO} + {NH4NO3} 
analogous to the reaction used for the industrial production of sodium cyanate, may be used.

Silver cyanate is a beige to gray powder. It crystallises in the monoclinic crystal system in space group P21/m with parameters a = 547.3 pm, b = 637.2 pm, c = 341.6 pm, and β = 91°. Each unit cell contains two cyanate ions and two silver ions. The silver ions are each equidistant from two nitrogen atoms forming a straight N-Ag-N group. The nitrogen atoms are each coordinated to two silver atoms, so that there are zigzag chains of alternating silver and nitrogen atoms going in the direction of the monoclinic "b" axis, with the cyanate ions perpendicular to that axis.

Silver cyanate reacts with nitric acid to form silver nitrate, carbon dioxide, and ammonium nitrate.

{AgNCO} + {2HNO3} + H2O \rarr {AgNO3} + CO2{\uparrow} + NH4NO3

See also 
 Silver fulminate

References

Silver compounds
Cyanates